Michael King (born 12 April 1962) is a New Zealand mental health advocate, television personality, and former comedian.

He is known in New Zealand as the spokesperson who marketed New Zealand pork, presenting 30-second TV commercials on cooking pork known as Mike's Meals until he disengaged from the pork industry.

King's television career began in 1997 with his debut in the New Zealand comedy show Pulp Comedy. Before television, King worked as a stand-up comedian. He was voted comedian of the year in 1997 by Metro magazine readers and nominated for the Billy T Award in the same year. After his television debut, King began to appear on more prominent New Zealand television comedy shows, notably Comedy Central, Game of Two Halves and Strassman. In 2002 he was nominated twice at the 2002 NZ Television Awards for his stand up show An Audience With the King. He went on to host Mike King Tonight from 2003. The show aired for only one season.

He is well known for his work on mental health advocacy, which began in 2009 with his radio show, The Nutters Club. It was broadcast on New Zealand's Radio Live and then Newstalk ZB. He founded The Key to Life Charitable Trust, in 2012 which promotes suicide prevention and suicide awareness. King was named New Zealander of the Year in 2019 for his mental health advocacy work. He was appointed an Officer of the New Zealand Order of Merit in 2019 and he returned the honour in 2021 as a protest over the lack of progress in the mental health system.

Early life
King was born in April 1962 and raised in Whenuapai, New Zealand. He is one of five siblings. King attended Massey High School from 1974 until 1977, and then trained as a chef from 1978 to 1981 at the Auckland Technical Institute in Auckland, New Zealand. Mike King lives in Papatoetoe with his family.

Career
Initially making his name as a stand up comedian, playing heavily on his Māori origins, he made the move to a more lucrative mainstream audience, appearing on the New Zealand TV shows Comedy Central, Game of Two Halves, Strassman, TV Bloopers and Practical Jokes, Pulp Comedy and Guess Who's Coming to Dinner. In 1997 he was nominated for the prestigious Billy T Award.

In 2003 King starred in his own talk show, Mike King Tonight, which was produced by Greenstone Pictures. The show ran for only one season.

In 2004 he hosted Mike King. Although similar in concept to Mike King Tonight, it was produced by Touchdown Television. It was shot on a smaller stage and no longer included the live band present on Mike King Tonight. It also ran for only one season.

Health
In 2006 he revealed that he suffered from depression, and took on the role of patron for the Phobic Trust. He provided further details in his 2008 autobiography.

On Jan 14, 2007, King collapsed in a Melbourne hotel and was left momentarily unconscious and partially paralyzed from a blood clot in a blood vessel which burst in the back of his neck, a very rare condition. He was attending a poker championship in Melbourne (a prize he claimed after winning a poker tournament in Auckland, New Zealand). It was not known whether he had a heart attack or stroke.
His life was saved by his good friend and poker player Richard Lancaster. Lancaster found him in a state of paralysis and sent him to Alfred Hospital.

Addiction and mental health
In recent interviews, King has openly released information surrounding his several-year addiction to the drug cocaine. He claims to have purchased a travel agency to assure himself of access to the drug: "If it ever came to it I could always jump on a plane and put myself up in a hotel for a few days".

In 2009, King started a Radio Live programme airing on Sunday evenings entitled The Nutters Club. On the programme, King works with mental health professionals David Codyre and Malcolm Falconer, and invites listeners to phone in with comments and to share stories or issues which might be troubling them. In 2013, The Nutters Club moved to Newstalk ZB.

In 2012, King founded the Key to Life Charitable Trust. In 2019 King was named New Zealander of the Year. After this, he set up a social media campaign for mental health awareness as well as a Gumboot Friday which raised money to help youth to access counselling.

In the 2019 Queen's Birthday Honours, King was appointed an Officer of the New Zealand Order of Merit (ONZM), for services to mental health awareness and suicide prevention. In June 2021, he returned the medal to the government in protest of a lack of progress improving the mental health system, a move he had foreshadowed a month prior. His resignation was accepted by the Queen, who directed that King's appointment as an Officer of the New Zealand Order of Merit be cancelled and annulled.

Pork marketing
Beginning in 2008, King was the spokesman for New Zealand Pork, presenting 30-second TV commercials showcasing quick-fix meals using pork known as Mike's Meals. He dropped out of the campaign after SAFE contacted him about pig farming conditions in New Zealand.

In May 2009, he spoke out against the factory farming of pigs, and apologised for his previous promotional work. Appearing on the Sunday programme, he said "I will not be a party to this brutality, this callous and evil treatment of pigs. It's disgusting and it needs to stop."

Driving charge
In November 2012, King was ordered to complete 200 hours of community work after pleading guilty to a driving charge.

Filmography

Television

Books 
 The Nutters Club (2011)

Personal life
King has been married since 2015 to Joanna King (née Methven), and they have one daughter.

Awards and recognitions
2019 Gladrap Boxing Awards Event of the year (Nominated)

References

External links 
 The Key to Life Charitable Trust Official Website

Living people
1962 births
New Zealand comedians
New Zealand television personalities
Officers of the New Zealand Order of Merit
People educated at Massey High School
Mental health activists